A smart number is any synthetic unique identifier that communicates additional information about the entity identified. The smart number is conceptually similar to a superkey as defined in the relational model of database organization, but, is intended to inform end users about status of accounts. The term has fallen out of common usage since using one number to carry so much information is considered bad practice.

Common examples of smart numbers in use today include:

 The US 9133880099 – carries information about place of birth.
 Credit card numbers – contains information about the credit issuing company.
 Auto insurance account numbers – vary by company but may contain information such as billing date, account status, and modification count.

The term smart number may also apply to non-geographic telephone numbers, such as Australia's 13, 1300 and 1800 vanity numbers and freephone numbers. See Intelligent Network.

Numbers
Identification